Lieutenant-General Sir Robert Lawrence Dundas  (27 July 1780 – 23 November 1844) was a British Whig and military commander during the Peninsular War. He was a Member of Parliament in the House of Commons  representing Malton from 1807 to 1812, East Retford from 1826 to 1827, and Richmond from 1828 to 1834  and from 1839 to 1841.

Early life and family

Dundas was born in Middlesex, the seventh son of Thomas Dundas and Lady Charlotte Fitzwilliam. His grandfathers were Sir Lawrence Dundas, 1st Baronet and William Fitzwilliam, 3rd Earl Fitzwilliam. His father succeeded to the baronetcy in 1781 and in 1794 was raised to the peerage as Baron Dundas. His elder brothers were Lawrence Dundas, 1st Earl of Zetland (1766–1839), Charles Lawrence Dundas (1771–1810), and Rear Admiral George Heneage Lawrence Dundas (1778–1834).

Career

Dundas entered the British Army on 1 December 1797 as a second lieutenant. He served as an engineer officer in the Anglo-Russian invasion of Holland. He became lieutenant in 1800 and the following year he served in Egypt against the French campaign, including the  Battle of Alexandria. He was promoted to captain in 1802 and major in 1804. In 1805, he served in the north of Germany with the Royal Staff Corps.

During the Peninsular War, he saw action at the Battles of Talavera (1809), Buçaco (1810), Fuentes de Oñoro (1811), Salamanca (1812), Vitoria (1813), the Pyrenees (1813), the Nivelle (1813), the Nive (1813), and Toulouse (1814).

For his services in the Peninsular War, he received the Army Gold Medal with Gold Cross and three clasps and was appointed a Knight of the Portuguese Order of the Tower and Sword in 1814 and a Knight Commander of the Order of the Bath (KCB) in 1815.

Dundas was promoted to Lieutenant-Colonel in 1811, full Colonel in 1821, Major-General in 1830 and Lieutenant-General in 1841. In June 1840, he was made colonel of the 59th (2nd Nottinghamshire) Regiment of Foot.

Personal life
Dundas was unmarried. He died at his home at Loftus Hall in Yorkshire, aged 64.

References

External links 

 
|-

1780 births
1844 deaths
Robert Lawrence
British Army lieutenant generals
British Army personnel of the Napoleonic Wars
UK MPs 1807–1812
UK MPs 1826–1830
UK MPs 1830–1831
UK MPs 1837–1841
Whig (British political party) MPs for English constituencies
Members of the Parliament of the United Kingdom for English constituencies
Younger sons of barons
Knights Commander of the Order of the Bath
Recipients of the Army Gold Cross
Recipients of the Army Gold Medal
Recipients of the Order of the Tower and Sword
Royal Engineers officers
Royal Staff Corps officers
59th Regiment of Foot officers